The 1899 European Figure Skating Championships were held from January 14th to 15th in Davos, Switzerland. Elite figure skaters competed for the title of European Champion in the category of men's singles. The competitors performed only compulsory figures.

Results

Men

Judges:
 K. Collin 
 F. von Groote 
 J. Günther 
 J. H. Nation 
 F. Stahel

References

Sources
 Result List provided by the ISU

European Figure Skating Championships, 1899
European Figure Skating Championships
International figure skating competitions hosted by Switzerland
Sport in Davos
1899 in Swiss sport
January 1899 sports events